The Renaissance of the 12th century  was a period of many changes at the outset of the High Middle Ages. It included social, political and economic transformations, and an intellectual revitalization of Western Europe with strong philosophical and scientific roots. These changes paved the way for later achievements such as the literary and artistic movement of the Italian Renaissance in the 15th century and the scientific developments of the 17th century.

Medieval renaissances

The groundwork for the rebirth of learning was laid by the process of political consolidation and centralization of the monarchies of Europe.  This process of centralization began with Charlemagne, King of the Franks from 768 to 814 and Holy Roman Emperor from 800 to 814.  Charlemagne's inclination towards education, which led to the creation of many new churches and schools where students were required to learn Latin and Greek, has been called the Carolingian Renaissance.

A second "renaissance" occurred during the reign of Otto I (The Great), King of the Saxons from 936 to 973 and Emperor of the Holy Roman Empire from 962.  Otto was successful in unifying his kingdom and asserting his right to appoint bishops and archbishops throughout his kingdom.  Otto's assumption of this ecclesiastical power brought him into close contact with the best educated and most able class of men in his kingdom.  Because of this close contact many new reforms were introduced in the Saxon Kingdom and in the Holy Roman Empire.  Thus, Otto's reign has been called the Ottonian Renaissance.

Therefore, the Renaissance of the 12th century has been identified as the third and final of the medieval renaissances.  Yet the renaissance of the twelfth century was far more thoroughgoing than those renaissances that preceded in the Carolingian or in the Ottonian periods.  Indeed, the Carolingian Renaissance was really more particular to Charlemagne himself, and was really more of a "veneer on a changing society" than a true renaissance springing up from society, and the same might be said of the Ottonian Renaissance.

Historiography
The Harvard professor Charles Homer Haskins was the first historian to write extensively about a renaissance that ushered in the High Middle Ages starting about 1070. In 1927, he wrote that:

The English art historian Kenneth Clark wrote that Western Europe's first "great age of civilisation" was ready to begin around the year 1000. From 1100, he wrote, monumental abbeys and cathedrals were constructed and decorated with sculptures, hangings, mosaics and works belonging to one of the greatest epochs of art and providing stark contrast to the monotonous and cramped conditions of ordinary living during the period. Abbot Suger of the Abbey of St. Denis is considered an influential early patron of Gothic architecture and believed that love of beauty brought people closer to God: "The dull mind rises to truth through that which is material". Clark calls this "the intellectual background of all the sublime works of art of the next century and in fact has remained the basis of our belief of the value of art until today".

Translation movement

The translation of texts from other cultures, especially ancient Greek works, was an important aspect of both this Twelfth-Century Renaissance and the later Renaissance of the 15th century. It is inaccurate, however, to say that the relevant difference was that Latin scholars of the earlier period focused almost entirely on translating and studying Greek and Arabic works of natural science, philosophy and mathematics, while the later Renaissance focused on literary and historical texts, since some of the most significant Greek translations of the 15th century were those by Mauricio Ficino, including several works of Plato and Neoplatonist authors, as well as a highly significant translation of the Corpus Hermeticum. These were works of Pythagorean and Platonic spirituality and philosophy of far more importance to later philosophical and religious debate than the translations of the 12th century.

Trade and commerce

The era of the Crusades brought large groups of Europeans into contact with the technologies and luxuries of Byzantium for the first time in many centuries. Crusaders returning to Europe brought numerous small luxuries and souvenirs with them, stimulating a new appetite for trade. The rising Italian maritime powers such as Genoa and Venice began to monopolize trade between Europe, Muslims, and Byzantium via the Mediterranean Sea, having developed advanced commercial and financial techniques; cities such as Florence became major centers of this financial industry.

In Northern Europe, the Hanseatic League was founded in the 12th century, with the foundation of the city of Lübeck in 1158–1159. Many northern cities of the Holy Roman Empire became Hanseatic cities, including Hamburg, Stettin, Bremen and Rostock. Hanseatic cities outside the Holy Roman Empire were, for instance, Bruges, London and the Polish city of Danzig (Gdańsk). In Bergen and Novgorod the league had factories and middlemen. In this period the Germans started colonizing Eastern Europe beyond the Empire, into Prussia and Silesia.

In the mid 13th century, the "Pax Mongolica" re-invigorated the land-based trade routes between China and West Asia that had fallen dormant in the 9th and 10th centuries. Following the Mongol incursion into Europe in 1241, the Pope and some European rulers sent clerics as emissaries and/or missionaries to the Mongol court; these included William of Rubruck, Giovanni da Pian del Carpini, Andrew of Longjumeau, Odoric of Pordenone, Giovanni de Marignolli, Giovanni di Monte Corvino, and other travelers such as Niccolò da Conti. While the accounts of Carpini et al were written in Latin as letters to their sponsors, the account of the later Italian traveller Marco Polo, who followed his father and uncle as far as China, was written first in French c.1300 and later in other popular languages, making it relatively accessible to larger groups of Europeans.

Science

After the collapse of the Western Roman Empire, Western Europe had entered the Middle Ages with great difficulties. Apart from depopulation and other factors, most classical scientific treatises of classical antiquity, written in Greek or Latin, had become unavailable or lost entirely. Philosophical and scientific teaching of the Early Middle Ages was based upon the few Latin translations and commentaries on ancient Greek scientific and philosophical texts that remained in the Latin West, the study of which remained at minimal levels. Only the Christian church maintained copies of these written works, and they were periodically replaced and distributed to other churches.

This scenario changed during the renaissance of the 12th century. For several centuries, popes had been sending clerics to the various kings of Europe. Kings of Europe were typically illiterate. Literate clerics would be specialists of some subject or other, such as music, medicine or history etc., otherwise known as Roman cohors amicorum, the root of the Italian word corte 'court'. As such, these clerics would become part of a king's retinue or court, educating the king and his children, paid for by the pope, whilst facilitating the spread of knowledge into the Middle Ages. The church maintained classic scriptures in scrolls and books in numerous scriptoria across Europe, thus preserving the classic knowledge and allowing access to this important information to the European kings. In return, kings were encouraged to build monasteries that would act as orphanages, hospitals and schools, benefiting societies and eventually smoothing the transition from the Middle Ages.

The increased contact with the Islamic world in Muslim-dominated Iberia and Southern Italy, the Crusades, the Reconquista, as well as increased contact with Byzantium, allowed Western Europeans to seek and translate the works of Hellenic and Islamic philosophers and scientists, especially the works of Aristotle. Several translations were made of Euclid but no extensive commentary was written until the middle of the 13th century.

The development of medieval universities allowed them to aid materially in the translation and propagation of these texts and started a new infrastructure which was needed for scientific communities. In fact, the European university put many of these texts at the centre of its curriculum, with the result that the "medieval university laid far greater emphasis on science than does its modern counterpart and descendant."

At the beginning of the 13th century, there were reasonably accurate Latin translations of some ancient Greek scientific works, though not of the Mechanika, an accurate translation of Euclid, or of the scientific advances of the NeoPlatonists. But those texts that were available were studied and elaborated, leading to new insights into the nature of the universe. The influence of this revival is evident in the scientific work of Robert Grosseteste and the NeoPlatonism of Bernardus Silvestris (?1085-?1178).

Technology

During the High Middle Ages in Europe, there was increased innovation in means of production, leading to economic growth.

Alfred Crosby described some of this technological revolution in The Measure of Reality : Quantification in Western Europe, 1250-1600 and other major historians of technology have also noted it.
 The earliest written record of a windmill is from Yorkshire, England,  dated 1185.
 Paper manufacture began in Spain around 1100, and from there it spread to France and Italy during the 12th century.
 The magnetic compass aided navigation, attested in Europe in the late 12th century.
 The astrolabe returned to Europe via Islamic Spain.
 The West's oldest known depiction of a stern-mounted rudder can be found on church carvings dating to around 1180.

Latin literature

The early 12th century saw a revival of the study of Latin classics, prose, and verse before and independent of the revival of Greek philosophy in Latin translation. The Cathedral schools at Chartres, Orleans, and Canterbury were centers of Latin literature staffed by notable scholars. John of Salisbury, secretary at Canterbury, became the bishop of Chartres. He held Cicero in the highest regard in philosophy, language, and the humanities. Latin humanists possessed and read virtually all the Latin authors we have today—Ovid, Virgil, Terence, Horace, Seneca, Cicero. The exceptions were few—Tacitus, Livy, Lucretius. In poetry, Virgil was universally admired, followed by Ovid.

Like the earlier Carolingian revival, the 12th-century Latin revival would not be permanent. While religious opposition to pagan Roman literature existed, Haskins argues that “it was not religion but logic” in particular “Aristotle’s New Logic toward the middle of [the 12th] century [that] threw a heavy weight on the side of dialectic ...” at the expense of the letters, literature, oratory, and poetry of the Latin authors. The nascent universities would become Aristotelean centers displacing the Latin humanist heritage until its final revival by Petrarch in the 14th century.

Roman law

The study of the Digest was the first step to the revival of Roman legal jurisprudence and the establishment of Roman law as the basis of civil law in continental Europe. The University of Bologna, recognised as the world's oldest continuously operating university, was Europe's centre of legal scholarship during this period.

Scholasticism

A new method of learning called scholasticism developed in the late 12th century from the rediscovery of the works of Aristotle; the works of medieval Muslims and Jews influenced by him, notably Maimonides, Avicenna (see Avicennism) and Averroes (see Averroism). The great scholastic scholars of the 13th century were Albertus Magnus, Bonaventure and Thomas Aquinas. Those who practiced the scholastic method defended Roman Catholic doctrines through secular study and logic. Other notable scholastics ("schoolmen") included Roscelin and Peter Lombard. One of the main questions during this time was the problem of the universals. Prominent non-scholastics of the time included Anselm of Canterbury, Peter Damian, Bernard of Clairvaux, and the Victorines.

Arts

The 12th-century renaissance saw a revival of interest in poetry. Writing mostly in their own native languages, contemporary poets produced significantly more work than those of the Carolingian Renaissance. The subject matter varied wildly across epic, lyric, and dramatic. Meter was no longer confined to the classical forms and began to diverge into newer schemes. Additionally, the division between religious and secular poetry became smaller. In particular, the Goliards were noted for profane parodies of religious texts.

These expansions of poetic form contributed to the rise of vernacular literature, which tended to prefer the newer rhythms and structures.

See also
 Continuity thesis
 Crisis of the Late Middle Ages

References

Citations

Bibliography
 
 Benson, Robert L., Giles Constable, and Carol D. Lanham, eds. (1982). Renaissance and Renewal in the Twelfth Century.  Cambridge: Harvard University Press.

External links
 A brief analysis of Haskins, Renaissance of the Twelfth Century
 A bibliography of the twelfth-century renaissance

12th century in Europe
Renaissance